The First Flight Handicap is an American Thoroughbred horse race held annually in late June/early July at Belmont Park in Elmont, New York. A Grade II event open to fillies and Mares, ages three and older, it is contested on dirt over a distance of seven furlongs.

The race is named in honor of Cornelius Vanderbilt Whitney's American Champion Two-Year-Old Filly of 1946. First Flight won the Matron Stakes, and beat male opponents in winning the Belmont Futurity Stakes.

Inaugurated in 1978, the race has been hosted by Aqueduct Racetrack and Belmont Park:
 Aqueduct – 1978–1989, 1991–2002, 2004–2006
 Belmont – 1990, 2001, 2003, 2007–present

Records
Speed record:
 1:20.60 – Shared Interest (1992)

Most wins:
 2 – Twist Afleet (1994, 1995)
 2 – Country Hideaway (1999, 2000)
 2 – Shine Again (2001, 2002)

Most wins by a jockey:
 4 – Jerry Bailey (1987, 1990, 1992, 1994)

Most wins by a trainer:
 6 – H. Allen Jerkens (1991, 1993, 1997, 2001, 2002, 2008)

Most wins by an owner:
 3 – Bohemia Stable (1997, 2001, 2002)

Winners

References
 The 2009 First flight Handicap at the NTRA

Graded stakes races in the United States
Sprint category horse races for fillies and mares
Recurring sporting events established in 1978
Belmont Park
Horse races in New York (state)